M-80s are an American class of large powerful firecrackers, sometimes called salutes. M-80s were originally made in the mid 20th century for the U.S. military to simulate explosives or artillery fire; later, M-80s were manufactured as fireworks. The tubes usually hold approximately 3 grams of pyrotechnic flash powder. The "M" is designated by a U.S. military convention for "standard" equipment and "80" is for the 80 grains (5 grams) of flash powder within it.

Legality

Canada
M-80s are not authorized under the law, making importation, possession, transportation, storage, or manufacture of them illegal in Canada.

United States
Because an M-80 is a pyrotechnic device containing a charge in excess of 50 milligrams of pyrotechnic flash powder, civilian use requires a license issued by federal authorities.  This is the result of the Child Protection Act of 1966 and regulation by the Consumer Product Safety Commission, with the purpose of limiting the potential property damage and bodily harm M-80s can cause.  This law also covers cherry bombs.

In 1975, federal regulations were passed to limit all consumer-grade fireworks available for general sale to the public in the United States to a maximum of 50 milligrams flash powder, down from a previous maximum of 200 milligrams. However, firecrackers mounted onto a rocket stick, or other aerial firework devices, such as rockets, Roman candles, and the larger version of M-80s (M-1000 etc.), may still have significantly more, up to 130 mg, or more, depending on device and classification, and can be legally purchased by any American civilian citizen, except where prohibited by state law.

A person with a federal explosives license, issued by the ATF, may be allowed to purchase M-80s. Federal and state officials sometimes distribute them to farmers to scare away wildlife damaging their crops.

Fake M-80
Many firecrackers sold legally in the United States to consumers have names and appearances intended to mimic the "M-80", such as for example "M-80 Firecracker", "M-8000", or "M-##" (where ## is a number). Those differ significantly from the actual "M-80" as they are subject to the regulations with regard to the sale of explosives and fireworks to the general public. These firecrackers most commonly have a small capsule with up to 50 mg of powder and a fuse in it. Surrounding the capsule is plaster or a similar material, and finally a red tube and two plastic endcaps. Because of the size of these firecrackers, buyers are occasionally deceived into thinking that the entire tube is full. Also the fuse, at times, protrudes from the ends of these firecrackers, as opposed to the middle of the tube in real M-80s. Genuine M-80s have paper endcaps, and contain 50–60 times more powder.

Contrary to urban legend, an M-80 that contains 3,000 mg of powder is not equivalent to a quarter-stick of dynamite. Dynamite generally contains a stable nitroglycerin-based high explosive, whereas M-80s or any other kind of firecracker contain a low explosive powder, like flash powder or black powder.

Accidents
Cases of documented injuries and accidents accompanied civilian M-80 use during the 1950s and 1960s, and still occur, as M-80s are still produced and sold to the public. There have been documented cases of users losing their fingers or hands.

During a July 8, 1976, Richmond Coliseum KISS concert, a fan threw an M-80 onto the stage, leaving drummer Peter Criss with partial hearing loss for the remainder of the night.

On October 10, 1977, during an Aerosmith concert in Philadelphia's Spectrum, a fan threw an M-80 firework that injured singer Steven Tyler's face, and lead guitarist Joe Perry's hand.

On May 24, 1983, a truck trailer being used as a clandestine fireworks factory manufacturing M-80 fireworks exploded outside of Rowesville, South Carolina, killing two, injuring five, and damaging houses up to two and a half miles away. Three days later an explosion at a clandestine fireworks factory producing M-80 and M-100 fireworks near Benton, Tennessee, killed eleven, injured one, and inflicted damage within a radius of several miles. Both operations were connected to a multi-state illegal fireworks distribution and production ring, and multiple people were eventually sent to prison for their involvement in both incidents.

The 1986 San Francisco fireworks factory explosion occurred when an illegal machine making M-80s failed, resulting in widespread destruction of a city block, killing at least 8 people, and devastating 125 small businesses. 

Angar Hussan, a fourteen-year-old Indian immigrant, died at the Beth Israel Medical Center in New York City on July 5, 1990, a day after he was struck in the throat by metal shards from an exploding steel garbage can while watching M-80 firecrackers being set off at a Fourth of July block party sponsored by the Hells Angels Motorcycle Club outside the club's headquarters in the East Village, Manhattan. Three other bystanders were injured, two seriously. Hells Angels members Anthony Morabito and John Tannuzzo were charged with second-degree murder in Hussan's death on October 22. The motorcycle club as a corporation also was indicted on the charges. Of the two men charged with murder, one was convicted of criminally negligent homicide, and the case against the other was dismissed.

July 1, 2019, ABC News reported that a nine-year-old girl was critically injured after handling what was suspected to be an M-80.

References

Further reading
 John Donner, A Professional's Guide to Pyrotechnics: Understanding and Making Exploding Fireworks, Paladin Press, 1997.

Types of fireworks
Bombs